Ruhann Burden (born September 8, 1983) is a Namibian cricketer. He is a right-handed batsman.

He played his first match for the Namibian cricket team in December 2006, as an opening batsman. In the second innings of his cricketing career, he was dismissed for a golden duck by Jandre Coetzee.

External links
Ruhann Burden at CricketArchive 

1983 births
Namibian cricketers
Living people
Place of birth missing (living people)